Jan van Helmont may refer to:

 Jan van Helmont (painter) (1650 – after 1714), a Flemish painter
 Jan Baptist van Helmont (1580 – 1644), a Flemish chemist, physiologist, and physician